Jinx is a British children's comedy television sitcom based on the 'Lulu Baker' trilogy of books, written by Fiona Dunbar. The first series premiered on 31 October 2009 on CBBC and ended its initial run on 23 January 2010. The series follows the life of Lulu Baker, a teenager who is able to conjure spells. However, her fairy godmother, Cookie, stops things from going smoothly.

The first series was produced by Kindle Entertainment and over a three-month period, filmed in BBC Manchester studios and Oxford Road Studios, a second series has not been commissioned yet. Australian free-to-air channel ABC3 started airing the first episode on 28 September 2010.

Overview 
The series chronicles the life of Lulu Rose Katherine Baker, a teenager whose father has recently been remarried to a woman whom Lulu believes to be the worst stepmother ever. However, her fairy godmother, Cookie, soon comes to Lulu's aid and together they use spells for good, although most situations turn out badly for the people involved, usually due to Cookie's incompetence.

Cast

Lia Fraleigh as Lulu Baker
Heather Russell as Cookie
Jemini Archer as Chip
Corbin Bleu as Frenchy
Jacob Ewanuix as Torquil Le Bone
Samuel Vincent as Mike
Gabriel Gianmaria as Minty Le Bone
Kevin Chamberlin as Mrs Kilbraith

Episodes

References

External links 
 
 

British children's comedy television series
BBC television comedy
BBC children's television shows
2009 British television series debuts
2010 British television series endings
2000s British sitcoms
2010s British sitcoms
BBC high definition shows
Television series by Kindle Entertainment
English-language television shows
2000s British children's television series
2010s British children's television series
British children's fantasy television series
Television series about teenagers